Générations Star Wars et Science Fiction (English: Star Wars and science fiction generations), also called Gen SW, is a French fan convention whose main subject is the Star Wars universe. Other topics are the comics, the science fiction and the fantasy. It is held once a year in Cusset, Allier since 1999. Among its most notable guests are the major Star Wars actors Anthony Daniels (C-3PO), Peter Mayhew (Chewbacca), Jake Lloyd (Anakin Skywalker) and David Prowse (Darth Vader) or renowned comics artists like Tom Palmer and Davide Fabbri.

Organizing this event is the main activity of the non-profit association Les Héritiers de la Force (English: The Heirs of the Force) which is not associated to nor endorsed by Lucasfilm Ltd. There is no entry fee for the visitors attending the convention.

History 
The first venue of the Générations Star Wars et Science Fiction occurred on October 10, 1999 and hosted 500 visitors. It's only in 2002, for the fourth edition, that the convention switched to its current format, a two-days event held on a week-end as close as possible to the French public holiday of May 1.

In 2003, the convention welcomed Jeremy Bulloch, the actor behind the bounty hunter Boba Fett. Since then, it ever hosted at least one Star Wars actor, except in 2007 when health problems forced Kenny Baker to cancel his visit. Comics artists are also mainstays since the coming of Italian artist Davide Fabbri in 2009, mainly with the help of Star Wars comics publisher in France, Delcourt. These guests, among others like stunt coordinator Nick Gillard or photographer Cédric Delsaux, helped the convention to grow up and attract more visitors, until the current record of 6500 attendees in 2014.

Activities 

The visitors are able to meet the actors and artists, ask them questions, obtain signings or take photos with them. There are also exhibitions, dioramas and merchandising shops. Sci-Fi fans associations present their activities and what they've created like real scale objects or vehicles. The main events regularly happening are cosplay contests, knowledges quizzes, fan art contests, Questions/Answers with the guests or conferences. Since 2013, charity sales are organized on the favour of the children service of Vichy's hospital.

Organizers 
The event is organized by the non-profit association Les Héritiers de la Force, based at Cusset. It is the association's main activity but its members also participate at other events or conventions, to promote Générations Star Wars or as cosplayers. They also go to hospitals to help the ill children.

The convention's posters are quite famous among the French Star Wars fandom because of the artworks of painter from Vichy Greg Massonneau.

The association, and thus the event, are supported by the General Council of Allier and the city of Cusset. There are also partnerships with comics publisher Delcourt and toy manufacturers Lego and Hasbro, for example.

Guests list 
Here is the complete list of the convention's guests, up to the 2014 edition.

Star Wars actors

Comics authors

Other guests

See also 

 Cusset
 Science fiction fandom
 Star Wars
 Star Wars comics
 Lego Star Wars

References

Further reading

External links 

 
 Description of the Espace Chambon

Star Wars fandom
Comics conventions
Festivals in France
Allier
Recurring events established in 1999
Science fiction conventions in Europe